Serghei Diulgher (born 21 March 1991) is a Moldovan footballer who plays for FC Florești in Moldovan National Division as a defender.

Club career
He spent most of his career playing at Moldovan National Division, with an exception being a short spell in Serbian First League with Sloboda Užice.

International career
He has represented his country at U19U21 international level.

Honours
Sheriff
Moldovan National Division: 2009–10
Moldovan Cup: 2010

Tiraspol
Moldovan Cup: 2013

References

External links
Serghei Diulgher at Dinamo-Auto

1991 births
Living people
People from Bender, Moldova
Moldovan footballers
Moldovan expatriate footballers
Association football defenders
FC Sheriff Tiraspol players
FC Tiraspol players
FC Dinamo-Auto Tiraspol players
Speranța Nisporeni players
Moldovan Super Liga players
FK Sloboda Užice players
Serbian First League players
FC Florești players
Expatriate footballers in Serbia